This is a list of the currently recognized species in the genus Ptilotus. All species are native to continental Australia, mostly in the arid regions, though one species also occurs in Tasmania and another in Malesia.

Ptilotus actinocladus T.Hammer & R.W.Davis  
Ptilotus aervoides (F.Muell.) F.Muell.  
Ptilotus albidus (C.A.Gardner) Benl  
Ptilotus alexandri Benl  
Ptilotus andersonii R.W.Davis  
Ptilotus angustifolius (Benl) T.Hammer  
Ptilotus aphyllus Benl  
Ptilotus appendiculatus Benl  
Ptilotus aristatus Benl    
Ptilotus arthrolasius F.Muell.  
Ptilotus astrolasius F.Muell.  
Ptilotus auriculifolius (Moq.) F.Muell.  
Ptilotus axillaris (Benth.) F.Muell. 
Ptilotus barkeri Benl 
Ptilotus beardii Benl 
Ptilotus beckerianus (F.Muell.) F.Muell. ex J.M.Black  
Ptilotus blackii Benl  
Ptilotus brachyanthus (Benth.) F.Muell.  
Ptilotus caespitulosus F.Muell.  (Salt Lake Mulla-Mulla)
Ptilotus calostachyus (F.Muell.) F.Muell.  (Weeping Mulla Mulla ) 
Ptilotus capensis (Benl) A.R.Bean 
Ptilotus capitatus (F.Muell.) C.A.Gardner   
Ptilotus carinatus Benl  
Ptilotus carlsonii F.Muell.  
Ptilotus chamaecladus Diels  
Ptilotus chippendalei Benl  
Ptilotus chortophytus (Diels) Schinz 
Ptilotus chrysocomus R.W.Davis 
Ptilotus clementii (Farmar) Benl  (Tassel Top)  
Ptilotus clivicola R.W.Davis & T.Hammer 
Ptilotus comatus Benl 
Ptilotus conicus R.Br. 
Ptilotus corymbosus R.Br.  
Ptilotus crispus Benl  
Ptilotus crosslandii (F.Muell.) Benl 
Ptilotus daphne Lally 
Ptilotus decalvatus Benl 
Ptilotus decipiens (Benth.) C.A.Gardner ex A.W.Hill 
Ptilotus declinatus Nees  (Curved Mulla Mulla)
Ptilotus disparilis Lally
Ptilotus dissitiflorus (F.Muell.) F.Muell.
Ptilotus distans (R.Br.) Poir.  
Ptilotus divaricatus (Gaudich.) F.Muell.  (Climbing Mulla Mulla)
Ptilotus drummondii (Moq.) F.Muell.  (Narrowleaf Mulla Mulla) 
Ptilotus eremita T.Hammer & R.W.Davis  
Ptilotus eriotrichus (Ewart & J.White) P.S.Short  
Ptilotus erubescens Schltdl. 
Ptilotus esquamatus (Benth.) F.Muell 
Ptilotus exaltatus Nees (Tall Mulla Mulla, Showy Foxtail)
Ptilotus exiliflorus R.W.Davis
Ptilotus extenuatus Benl 
Ptilotus falcatus R.W.Davis & T.Hammer 
Ptilotus fasciculatus W.Fitzg.  
Ptilotus fusiformis (R.Br.) Poir.  
Ptilotus gardneri Benl  
Ptilotus gaudichaudii (Steud.) J.M.Black  
Ptilotus giganteus (A.Cunn. ex Moq.) R.W.Davis & R.Butcher 
Ptilotus gomphrenoides F. Muell. ex Benth.  
Ptilotus grandiflorus F.Muell.  
Ptilotus halophilus R.W.Davis  
Ptilotus helichrysoides (F.Muell.) F.Muell. 
Ptilotus helipteroides (F.Muell.) F.Muell.  (Hairy Mulla Mulla) 
Ptilotus holosericeus (Moq.) F.Muell.  
Ptilotus humilis (Nees) F.Muell. 
Ptilotus incanus (R.Br.) Poir.  
Ptilotus indivisus Benl 
Ptilotus johnstonianus W.Fitzg.  
Ptilotus kenneallyanus Benl  
Ptilotus lanatus Moq.  
Ptilotus latifolius R.Br. (Tangled Mulla Mulla) 
Ptilotus lazaridis Benl  
Ptilotus leucocoma (Moq.) F.Muell. ( Small Purple Foxtail)
Ptilotus lophotrichus Benl
Ptilotus luteolus (Benl & H.Eichler) R.W.Davis
Ptilotus maconochiei Benl
Ptilotus macrocephalus (R.Br.) Poir.  (Green Pussytails, Featherheads)
Ptilotus manglesii (Lindl.) F.Muell  (Pom Poms)
Ptilotus marduguru Benl  
Ptilotus mitchellii Benl  
Ptilotus modestus T.Hammer  
Ptilotus mollis Benl 
Ptilotus murrayi F.Muell.  
Ptilotus nobilis (Lindl.) F.Muell.  (Yellowtails, Regal Foxtail)
Ptilotus obovatus (Gaudich.)  F.Muell.  (Smoke Bush, Cotton Bush)
Ptilotus parvifolius (F.Muell.) F.Muell.  
Ptilotus pedleyanus Benl & H.Eichler 
Ptilotus polakii F.Muell.  
Ptilotus polystachyus (Gaudich.) F.Muell.  (Prince of Wales Feather) 
Ptilotus procumbens Benl   
Ptilotus propinquus Lally  
Ptilotus pseudohelipteroides Benl  
Ptilotus psilorhachis T.Hammer & R.W.Davis  
Ptilotus pyramidatus (Moq.) F.Muell.  
Ptilotus remotiflorus Benl  
Ptilotus rigidus Lally  
Ptilotus robynsianus Benl  
Ptilotus roei (Benth.) F.Muell.  
Ptilotus rotundatus Benl  
Ptilotus rotundifolius (F.Muell.) F.Muell.  (Royal Mulla Mulla) 
Ptilotus royceanus Benl  
Ptilotus schwartzii Tate  
Ptilotus semilanatus (Lindl.) J.M.Black 
Ptilotus seminudus (J.M.Black) J.M.Black  
Ptilotus senarius A.R.Bean 
Ptilotus sericostachyus (Nees) F.Muell.  
Ptilotus sessilifolius (Lindl.) Benl  
Ptilotus spathulatus (R.Br.) Poir.  (Pussy Tails)
Ptilotus spicatus Benth.
Ptilotus stirlingii (Lindl.) F.Muell.  (Stirling's Mulla Mulla) 
Ptilotus subspinescens R.W.Davis  
Ptilotus symonii Benl  
Ptilotus tetrandrus Benl  
Ptilotus trichocephalus Benl  
Ptilotus unguiculatus T.Hammer  
Ptilotus villosiflorus F.Muell.  
Ptilotus whitei (J.M.Black) Lally  
Ptilotus wilsonii Benl
Ptilotus xerophilus T.Hammer & R.W.Davis
Ptilotus yapukaratja R.W.Davis & T.Hammer

Further reading

References

Ptilotus species
Ptilotus